Henrik Åhnstrand (born 29 July 1979) is a Swedish professional football manager, who was most recently managed Allsvenskan club GIF Sundsvall, but has now joined IK Sirius Fotboll as an assistent manager.

Playing career
As a player, Åhnstrand was a member of GIF Sundsvall and Söderhamns FF, before suffering an injury that forced him to retire. Before that, he had made 6 appearances in two years for Söderhamns FF.

Career
After retiring as a player for Söderhamns FF, Åhnstrand took up coaching and became head coach of the club in 2010. He would afterwards manage Hudiksvalls FF for several years. While coaching the club, in November 2015, he was admitted to the UEFA Pro Licence programme.

Åhnstrand was appointed assistant coach at his former club GIF Sundsvall in November 2017, a position he shared with Ferran Sibila. After long-time manager Joel Cedergren was dismissed in August 2019 due to disappointing results, and his successor Tony Gustavsson failed to turn the tide, Åhnstrand was promoted to the position as manager in December 2019. Director of football at the club, Urban Hagblom stated to the club website upon the hiring of Åhnstrand that "we work with the development of talent in Norrland, but not just players. Henrik Åhnstrand is a clear proof of our talent development even with coaches in the region".

Åhnstrand was sacked on 28 July 2022, as GIF Sundsvall were second to bottom in the league with 10 points in 15 games.

Personal life
Åhnstrand lives in Sundsvall with his wife and two children.

Career statistics

Managerial statistics

References

1979 births
Living people
People from Nyköping Municipality
GIF Sundsvall players
GIF Sundsvall managers
Superettan managers
Swedish football managers
Swedish footballers
Association footballers not categorized by position
Sportspeople from Södermanland County